In-Joo Cho (Hangul: 조인주, Hanja: 曺仁柱) (born April 13, 1969 in Damyang, Jeollanam-do, South Korea) is a former boxer from South Korea. He held the WBC and Lineal Super flyweight titles.

Amateur career
In 1987, Oh won the gold medal in flyweight at the World Junior Amateur Boxing Championships held in.

Pro career

See also
List of super flyweight boxing champions
List of WBC world champions

References

External links
 
Cho In-joo - CBZ Profile

1969 births
Super-bantamweight boxers
Super-flyweight boxers
World Boxing Council champions
World boxing champions
World super-flyweight boxing champions
Living people
South Korean male boxers
People from Damyang County
Sportspeople from South Jeolla Province